Bugatti made a series of Grand Prix, and later Formula One, straight-8 racing engines; between 1922 and 1939, and once again in 1956.

Background
Bugatti commonly used 16-valve to 24-valve, single-overhead and double-overhead cam, two-valve to four-valve per cylinder, straight-eight engines. Bugatti built numerous successful racing cars; with high-performance single-overhead, or dual-overhead-camshaft, straight-eight engines, in the 1920s and 1930s.

Ettore Bugatti experimented with straight-eight engines from 1922, and in 1924, he introduced the 2 L Bugatti Type 35, one of the most successful racing cars of all time, which eventually won over 1000 races. Like the Duesenbergs, Bugatti got his ideas from building aircraft engines during World War I, and like them, his engine was a high-revving overhead camshaft unit with three valves per cylinder. It produced  at 5,000 rpm and could be revved to over 6,000 rpm. Nearly 400 of the Type 35 and its derivatives were produced, an all-time record for Grand Prix motor racing.

Applications
Bugatti T30
Bugatti T32
Bugatti T35B
Bugatti T35C
Bugatti T36
Bugatti T39
Bugatti T51
Bugatti T53
Bugatti T54
Bugatti T59/50B
Bugatti T251

Reference 

Engines by model
Bugatti
Gasoline engines by model
Straight-eight engines